Gonzalo Millán (1947–2006) was a Chilean writer and poet.

Works
Personal relationship (1968)
The City (1979, 1994, 2007)
Life (1984)
Pseudonyms of death (1984)
Virus (1987)
Dragon biting its tail (1987)
5 love poems (1990)
Strange houses (1991)
Thirteen Moons (1997)
Chiaroscuro (2002)
Memory Self-Portrait (2005)
Blue scorpion venom. Daily Life and Death (2007)
Cabinet Paper (2008)

Chilean male poets
1947 births
2006 deaths
Writers from Santiago
20th-century Chilean poets
20th-century Chilean male writers